Sir John Hardman (c.1694 – 6 December 1755) was an English merchant, slave trader, politician and corncutter. He was engaged in the slave trade between England, Africa and the West Indies; along with his brother James, Hardman undertook 46 slave voyages between 1729 and 1759.

Biography 
He was born around 1694. Hardman was originally from Rochdale and came from an old Lancashire family of landed gentry. He was the second but elder surviving son of Richard Hardman and Elizabeth Fernyside, his only brother was James Hardman (born 1697). Hardman had been appointed to care for the feet of King William III and was the son of James Hardman who had fought for the Royalists in the English Civil War.  

In 1736, Hardman purchased the manor of Allerton Hall and rebuilt it in grand, Palladian style. During this time he began a career slave trading.

Hardman regularly gave evidence to the Board of Trade on behalf of Liverpool Corporation, and was later elected as a member of the British Parliament for that constituency in 1754, but died the following year. He had organised a survey on behalf of the Liverpool merchants of the possibility of a canal to join the rivers Trent and Mersey.

According to Dagnall (1961), John Hardman had a striking appearance with flowing locks of golden hair, curled whiskers, earrings, and curiously cut coat and waistcoat. He paraded the streets in this bizarre attire to attract the attention of prospective customers.

Legacy 
Hardman Earle, 1st Baronet was named after Hardman. Additionally, Hardman Street, Liverpool is named for the Hardman family of Allerton Hall. Despite this, Hardman's role in the slave trade makes him a controversial figure.

References 

British MPs 1754–1761
Businesspeople from Liverpool
Members of the Parliament of Great Britain for Liverpool
British slave traders